= Semari Taluka Purwa =

Village in Uttar Pradesh, India

Semari Taluka Purwa is a village in Prayagraj, Uttar Pradesh, India.
